Clova is a village in Glen Clova, Angus, Scotland.
 It lies on the River South Esk, some 12 miles north of Kirriemuir.

During the 1745 Jacobite Rising, Lord David Ogilvy (1725-1803) raised a regiment from local tenants; it retreated in good order from Culloden on 16 April and was disbanded at Clova on 21st.

References

Villages in Angus, Scotland